Bani Hajer is a district in Qatar, located in the municipality of Al Rayyan.

In the 2015 census it was listed as a district of Zone 51, which has a population of 56,027 and also includes Izghawa, Gharrafat Al Rayyan, Al Gharrafa, Al Seej, Rawdat Egdaim and Al Themaid.

The district is about 10 km away from central Doha. It is bordered to the north by Rawdat Egdaim.

Landmarks
Fereej Bani Hajer Stadium (managed by Qatar Olympic Committee) on Al Athab Street.
Bani Hajer Roundabout.

Development
Ashghal (The Public Works Authority) launched a QR 322 million road and infrastructure project in Bani Hajer in 2015. One of the primary focuses of the project was the construction of paved roads in future housing areas. New roads linking existing neighborhoods to arterial roads and building additional roads into Rawdat Egdaim were also planned. In February 2018, the project was completed. According to Saoud Al Tamimi, Roads Projects Department Manager at Ashghal, the project resulted in a 60% reduction in time spent traveling in the district and helped integrate the roads into the national expressway network. Overall, 91 km of shared pedestrian and cycling paths, 1,937 light poles, 7,100 parking bays and over 20 km of road was constructed.

The most vital road constructed as part of the road and infrastructure project was Bani Hajer Interchange, which links westward Dukhan with Bani Hajer and Al Rayyan City. Four overpasses, two loops and two link bridges are included on this highway, the most heavily trafficked being the Bani Hajer Underpass which connects Bani Hajer's Al Shahama Street to Al Rayyan Al Jadeed Street in Al Rayyan City.

Education
The following schools are located in Bani Hajer:

References

Populated places in Al Rayyan